Kavalthurai Ungal Nanban is a 2020 Indian Tamil language crime thriller film written and directed by RDM. Produced by Rajapondiyan, Bhaskaran B and Suresh Ravi under the banners of BR Talkies Corporation and White Moon Talkies. The film stars Suresh Ravi and Raveena Ravi, with RJ Munna, Supergood Subramani and Sharath Ravi in supporting roles. This film was presented by Vetrimaaran. The film was released on 27 November 2020.

Synopsis

When his wife is robbed and molested, Prabhu tries to report the crime. However, when the police take a dislike towards him, he wounds up on the receiving end of their cruelty.Prabhu goes for noc for passport but si makes him write wrong letter that objects by scribbling the letter and walks out of police station.  Now inspector threats that noc only from him , he can get, deep grieved Prabhu comes back and hits inspector with a chair making him coma, prabhu gets arrested and tortured and finally carried away to another station. But when his wife comes police station,  police people keeps saying they don't know where is prabhu.

Cast 

 Suresh Ravi as Prabhu
 Raveena Ravi as Indhu 
 Mime Gopi as Kannabiran
 Supergood Subramani as Murugesan
 Sharath Ravi as Sathish
 RJ Munna as Sathyan
 Kathiravan Balu as Manikandan
 Sathyan as Senthil

Production 
In 2018, the film director RDM, also known as Ranjith Manikandan, has zeroed in on the popular slogan, Kavalthurai Ungal Nanban, for the title of his next film. Video jockey Suresh Ravi was cast in the lead role. The film director and the actor had previously collaborated for a comedy caper titled Adhi Maedhavigal in 2014, which was shelved before release. Talking about the film, Suresh Ravi said, "KUN will be the first heavy-weight drama in my career. The film will play on the relationship dynamics between a police officer and a food delivery executive, who come together by chance. While I play the delivery boy, Mime Gopi will be seen as the cop. Our film will celebrate the real police spirit, which is, unfortunately, being shown in poor light in many films". In January 2020, the film producer G. Dhananjayan had acquired all the rights of the film.

Reception 
M. Suganth rated the film 3.5 out of 5 and called it, "A harrowing account of how institutions of power abuse it". Navein Darshan of The New Indian Express said, "KUN is a reminder that content is king and presenting a hard-hitting story is still possible sans any big names. If only this effectively arresting film hadn't fallen prey to some commercial compromises and monotonous representation, it could have been so much more". Sify said, "the title Kaavalthurai Ungal Nanban might sound as if the film is yet another fictional plot to glorify the cops. But the film's director RDM has registered the vicious side of the police force with his maiden venture, which is hard-hitting".

References

External links 
 

2020 crime thriller films
2020 films
2020s police films
2020s Tamil-language films
Indian crime thriller films
Indian police films
Works about police brutality